Maggie Wall (died Perthshire c. 1657), was believed to have been burned as a witch. She is best known for the memorial monument in Dunning, Perthshire inscribed with "Maggie Wall burnt here 1657 as a witch". The skull of Maggie Wall is claimed to be on display in the Saracen Head pub in Gallowgate, Glasgow.

Life 
There is no public record of Maggie Wall, the only record of her is in anecdotal accounts and stories. It remains a mystery whether she did exist. She is believed to have been condemned as a witch in the 17th century, as part of the Scottish Witch Trials. 

There are a number of theories about her identity. One theory suggests she was a member of the Rollos family, a powerful family that lived in Duncrub Castle. Another suggests she was part of a group of 120 women who attacked a group from the Presbytery of Perth who set out to discipline a minister, Rev. George Muschet. The group of women aimed to protect the Reverend from being disciplined, but it is thought that Maggie Wall could have been caught up in this and this might have resulted in her being burnt as a witch.

However, it is unlikely that she existed, given the detailed accounts of witch trials and sentences which still exist to this day. It is possible that the name "Maggie Wall" refers to the wall which ran around "Muggie's Wood".

Death 
When condemned as a witch in Scotland during the witch trials, it was custom to strangle the women to death before burning them. So it is likely Maggie wall would have been strangled before being burned. 

Records suggest around 6-9 women were condemned as witches and died in Dunning.

Monument 

The memorial monument can be found less than a mile outside of Dunning, a village in Perthshire in Scotland. It can be accessed from B8062 from the A9. The monument stands 20ft (~6 metres) high, it is made of stones and resembles a cairn. It has a stone cross on the top of it and bears the painted inscription "Maggie Wall burnt here 1657 as a witch".

The monument is the only known monument erected in memory of a witch in Scotland. The first record of the monument appears around 1800, but exactly when the monument was erected is contested. A number of mysteries surround the monument, such as it is unknown who re-paints the inscription. 

The author Geoff Holder tried to shed new light on Maggie Wall and the monument in his book Paranormal Perthshire. Geoff Holder concluded that the monument was very likely a folly or cenotaph to all the women burned as witches in Dunning, with Maggie Wall being a composite figure, named after the surrounding land.

The monument is also known to have been visited by the "Moors murderers" Myra Hindley and Ian Brady in September 1965.

References 

Witchcraft in Scotland
1657 deaths